This article is a list of books in The Railway Series, a British series of children's books written by both the Rev. W. Awdry and his son Christopher Awdry.

The Rev. W. Awdry Era: 1945–1972 
The first 26 books in the series were written by Rev. W. Awdry.

The Three Railway Engines 
 Book no. 1
 Published 12 May 1945
 Illustrated by William Middleton, later by C. Reginald Dalby

 Stories
 Edward's Day Out
 Edward and Gordon
 The Sad Story of Henry
 Edward, Gordon and Henry

This is the first book in the series, and introduces Edward, Gordon, Henry and The Fat Director (then later became The Fat Controller; also known as Sir Topham Hatt).

 Notes
 These stories were first told to the young Christopher Awdry when he was sick with measles in 1942, but due to wartime conditions, they were not published until 1945.
 Two of the three shed engines are not mentioned again. 
 These stories were not intended to take place in a single volume, or even on the same railway. Edward, Gordon and Henry was written at the insistence of the publishers, Edmund Ward & Co, to bring the three characters together and to create a happy ending.
 The stories were originally illustrated by William Middleton. However, Awdry was unhappy with the toy-like depictions of his characters and several errors in the artwork. In 1949, C. Reginald Dalby made new illustrations to replace Middleton's illustrations (but not just replacing) but as Dalby's own illustration versions, and it is this version that remains in print.
 The events of The Sad Story of Henry take place in 1922, while the remaining stories take place in 1923.

Thomas the Tank Engine 
 Book no. 2
 Published 14 September 1946
 Illustrated by Reginald Payne, later modified by C. Reginald Dalby

 Stories
 Thomas and Gordon
 Thomas's Train
 Thomas and the Trucks
 Thomas and the Breakdown Train
Thomas is a tank engine who works at a big train station, fetching coaches for the big engines and longs for greater things beyond the station yard. Unfortunately, his efforts go wrong. However, after showing that he can be a useful engine following James' accident with some trucks, he is rewarded with his own branch line and his two coaches named Annie and Clarabel.

 Notes
 First appearances of Thomas, James, and Thomas's coaches Annie and Clarabel (who are not named yet until on the fourth issue "Tank Engine Thomas Again", also mentioned in the first chapter "Thomas and the Guard").
 The big station is not identified but it is most likely Vicarstown.
 The Fat Controller makes his return in this book, and is changed from a pompous figure of fun to a more fatherly character. He is also established as the sole director of the railway, rather than one of several. 
 C. Reginald Dalby is often erroneously identified as the illustrator. The original artist was actually Reginald Payne; Dalby simply made some further touches to the illustrations in 1950. One noticeable change was the fifth illustration of Thomas and Gordon, where Thomas pulls the coaches in backwards; when originally painted he was pulling them in forwards.
 This was the first book to include a foreword, a feature that would appear in every subsequent book in the Series.
 The first two stories take place in 1924, while the latter two take place in 1925.

James the Red Engine 
 Book no. 3
 Published September 1948
 Illustrated by C. Reginald Dalby

 Stories
 James and the Top Hat
 James and the Bootlace
 Troublesome Trucks
 James and the Express

James has recently been repainted bright red and given the proper brakes for his wheels, and is eager to show off. Unfortunately, however, he is rather careless, and gets into a lot of trouble (in James and the Bootlace, James is grumpy after being threatened with blue paint and having to fetch his own coaches). But by making some troublesome trucks behave and by pulling the Express very well, he proves himself later.

 Notes
 The Fat 'Director' is renamed the Fat "Controller" in this book. This is because, like most railways in Great Britain, this railway had just been nationalised and was now part of British Railways.
 This was the first volume to be illustrated by C. Reginald Dalby from first publication.
 Awdry often said that this was his least favourite book, as it had been written in a hurry to meet a deadline rather than purely from inspiration.
 The events of this book take place in 1925. However, the book's foreword, which states that Nationalisation had just taken place, would lead to the suggestion that the stories took place in 1948.

Tank Engine Thomas Again 
 Book no. 4
 Published September 1949
 Illustrated by C. Reginald Dalby

 Stories
 Thomas and the Guard
 Thomas Goes Fishing
 Thomas, Terence and the Snow
 Thomas and Bertie

This book concerns the further adventures of Thomas on his branch line, with the bigger engines relegated to cameo appearances. Thomas leaves his guard (or railway conductor) behind by mistake; accidentally goes fishing because of a broken water column and some river water from a bucket; gets stuck in the snow and is freed by Terence; and has a race with Bertie.

 Notes
 First appearances of Terence and Bertie.
 Annie and Clarabel are named for the first time in this book.
 The bridge that appears in Thomas Goes Fishing is based on Isambard Kingdom Brunel's bridge at Maidenhead.
 Henry's brief appearance in the book caused a great deal of trouble for Awdry, as Dalby depicted him as looking identical to Gordon. The author received several complaints, and developed a stock answer to explain the problem – that Henry had been repaired using Gordon's spare parts.
 The events of Thomas and the Guard took place in 1927, "Thomas Goes Fishing" took place in 1931. Thomas,Terence and the Snow took place during the harsh winter of 1947, and Thomas & Bertie takes place in 1948.

Troublesome Engines 
 Book no. 5
 Published January 1950
 Illustrated by C. Reginald Dalby

 Stories
 Henry and the Elephant
 Tenders and Turntables
 Trouble in the Shed
 Percy Runs Away

The big engines miss Thomas. Since he left to run his branch line, they feel overworked, and some embarrassing incidents for all three of them lead them to go on strike. The Fat Controller addresses the problem by bringing in a new engine to do the shunting.

 Notes
 First appearance of Percy. Awdry was unhappy with Dalby's depiction of the character, which he felt did not look like a real engine ("a green caterpillar with red stripes"). This would cause further friction between the author and the illustrator later on.
 Henry appears in green for the first time since the end of The Three Railway Engines, at the end of which he had been painted blue.
 The central theme of this book reflects the fact that, at the time when the book was written, there were labour difficulties on the real British Railways.
 The events of this book take place in 1926. However according to The Island of Sodor: Its People, History and Railways, Percy was appointed station pilot at Tidmouth, as shown on pp 42–43 of this book, in 1949, meaning the events of this book presumably take place around that year. Furthermore, it should also be noted the same work dates Henry's accident and re-build to a new appearance - first seen in the following book - to 1935. It can be assumed that this was a mistake.

Henry the Green Engine 
 Book no. 6
 Published June 1951
 Illustrated by C. Reginald Dalby

 Stories
 Coal
 The Flying Kipper
 Gordon's Whistle
 Percy and the Trousers
 Henry's Sneeze

Henry has been having a lot of problems. He cannot steam properly, and so is often ill. The Fat Controller tries to solve the problem with expensive Welsh coal. When Henry has an accident, the Fat Controller decides to solve the problems once and for all by sending Henry to Crewe Works. Henry returns with a new shape and a much better outlook on life, and enjoys a number of adventures with the other engines.

 Notes
 This was the only book to feature five stories instead of the usual four.
 This is the first book to refer to the Fat Controller by his formal name, Sir Topham Hatt.
 This book was largely written because Awdry was unhappy with C. Reginald Dalby's depiction of Henry. He was inconsistent and often looked identical to Gordon. By having the character rebuilt, this problem was solved.
 This was the first book in which all the engines carried numbers. Thomas 1, Edward 2, Henry 3, Gordon 4, James 5 and Percy 6.
 The story Henry's Sneeze was to cause problems for Awdry, because it described some soot-covered boys who ran away as being "as black as niggers." In 1972, complaints were made about the use of the term. Despite initially resisting, Awdry was convinced to make the change by a parent who wrote to him on the subject. The line was changed in subsequent editions to "as black as soot".
 The events of "Coal" take place in 1934 and the rest of the book takes place in 1935. The events of "the Flying Kipper" were inspired by the Abbots Ripton rail accident.

Toby the Tram Engine 

 Book no. 7
 Published April 1952
 Illustrated by C. Reginald Dalby

 Stories
 Toby and the Stout Gentleman
 Thomas in Trouble
 Dirty Objects
 Mrs. Kyndley's Christmas

Thomas is having trouble with the police – by traveling to the quarry without a cowcatcher and side plates to cover his wheels. The Fat Controller realizes that there is a solution. While on holiday with his wife and two grandchildren, he met Toby the Tram Engine, who together with his coach Henrietta, has been having problems of his own with his railway in East Anglia closing down.

 Notes
 First appearances of Toby, Henrietta, Mrs. Kyndley, Stephen, and Bridget. Stephen, seen in this book as a child, would become the third Fat Controller by the time of "James and the Diesel Engines" except for Old Stuck-Up which takes place in 1976.
 The character of Toby was first inspired by a similar engine seen shunting at Great Yarmouth by the Rev. W. and Christopher Awdry.
 Although Mrs. Kyndley's Christmas wasn't adapted, a flashback from this story was used in the TV version of Thomas' Christmas Party.
 The events of this book take place in 1951.

Gordon the Big Engine 
 Book no. 8
 Published December 1953
 Illustrated by C. Reginald Dalby

 Stories
 Off the Rails
 Leaves
 Down the Mine
 Paint Pots and Queens

Gordon has an accident by means of being lazy and careless, and so is taken off passenger train duties. He helps the other engines out when they get into trouble, and is eventually judged to be sensible enough to pull the Royal Train.

Notes
 This book featured an appearance by Queen Elizabeth II, who succeeded her deceased father, King George VI, in 1952, and was crowned in 1953. Awdry had sent copies of the early Railway Series books to the young Prince Charles, the Duke of Cornwall (later Prince of Wales and Finally, King of The United Kingdom) as a gift.
 The first three stories of this book take place in the latter half of 1952, while Paint Pots and Queens take place in 1953.

Edward the Blue Engine 
 Book no. 9
 Published February 1954
 Illustrated by C. Reginald Dalby

 Stories
 Cows
 Bertie's Chase
 Saved from Scrap
 Old Iron

Edward is the oldest and wisest engine on Sodor. He is also kind and sensible. In this book, Edward is long overdue for an overhaul. However, he shows that he is far from useless, and can teach the bigger engines a thing or two.

 Notes
 First appearances of Trevor and the Vicar of Wellsworth.
 Edward's driver and fireman are identified in this book as being named Charlie Sand and Sidney Hever, the only engine crew to be given names (apart from Henry's fireman, revealed to be named Ted in the Thomas & Friends annuals).
 The events of this book take place in the first half of 1952.

Four Little Engines 
 Book no. 10
 Published October 1955
 Illustrated by C. Reginald Dalby

 Stories
 Skarloey Remembers
 Sir Handel
 Peter Sam and the Refreshment Lady
 Old Faithful

Rheneas is away being mended, and the Skarloey Railway has recently acquired Sir Handel and Peter Sam. Peter Sam is naïve but well-meaning, but Sir Handel is rude and arrogant. Skarloey shows Sir Handel how to do things when he rescues the pompous engine's train.

 Notes
 This book was written at the suggestion of L. T. C. Rolt and was based upon the Talyllyn Railway.
 The story "Peter Sam and the Refreshment Lady" was inspired by an incident when Wilbert Awdry was left behind on the Talyllyn Railway When He Was A Volunteer As A Guard.
 The other 3 stories in the book are all based directly on L. T. C. Rolt's book Railway Adventure which describes the first 2 years of operation of the Talyllyn Railway by enthusiasts.
 The illustration of Glennock Station is based on Aberllefenni Station on the Corris Railway.
 The events of this book take place in 1952, directly following the events of the previous book.

Percy the Small Engine 
 Book no. 11
 Published September 1956
 Illustrated by C. Reginald Dalby

 Stories
 Percy and the Signal
 Duck Takes Charge
 Percy and Harold
 Percy's Promise

Percy loves playing jokes, which sometimes gets him into trouble with the bigger engines. So the Fat Controller obtains a new engine to do shunting work and sends Percy to work with Thomas and Toby on their branch line. He meets Harold the Helicopter and saves the day during a flood.
 First appearances of Duck and Harold.
 This was the last volume to be illustrated by C. Reginald Dalby. Awdry did not like the way Dalby portrayed Percy, saying that he made the engine look like "a green caterpillar with red stripes". Outraged, Dalby resigned from the Railway Series after this book. Brian Sibley notes that, despite the friction between author and illustrator, Dalby's work in this volume can be ranked among his best.
 The events of this book take place in 1955.

The Eight Famous Engines 
 Book no. 12
 Published November 1957
 Illustrated by John T. Kenney

 Stories
 Percy Takes the Plunge
 Gordon Goes Foreign  
 Double Header
 The Fat Controller's Engines

The Fat Controller's engines — Thomas, Edward, Henry, Gordon, James, Percy, Toby, and Duck — have become famous through their appearances in books and on the radio. While the engines enjoy a number of adventures and misadventures, the Fat Controller arranges for them to go to London.

 Notes
 Although no new regular characters appear in this book, it features the only appearance of engines from The Other Railway, namely: Jinty, Pug and the Foreign Engine.
 This was the first book to be illustrated by John T. Kenney, who enjoyed a far better working relationship with Awdry than his predecessor. Although his illustrations are not as well remembered as the more charming ones by Dalby, they are far more technically accurate.
 The Rev. W. Awdry had intended this as a possible final book in the series. He considered using the title "The Fat Controller's Engines", a title that would later almost be used by Christopher Awdry in the 39th book of the series.
 Beatrice makes an appearance in the last illustration of "Double Header".
 "Gordon Goes Foreign" was originally going to be adapted for television, but it was cancelled due to the budget being too high.
 The events of this book take place in 1956.

Duck and the Diesel Engine 
 Book no. 13
 Published August 1958
 Illustrated by John T. Kenney

 Stories
 Domeless Engines
 Pop Goes the Diesel
 Dirty Work
 A Close Shave

Duck has settled in well on the Island of Sodor, so much so that the other engines are getting a little tired of his know-it-all attitude and new-found pride in the Great Western Railway following a visit from the City of Truro. They are pleased when a smooth-talking diesel engine – simply known as Diesel – arrives to help out. When Duck shows him up, Diesel vows revenge, and starts spreading malicious lies about Duck (forcing him to be sent away). Luckily, the Fat Controller has a plan to clear Duck's name.

 Notes
 First appearance of Diesel and City of Truro. This would be Diesel's only canonical appearance in the Railway Series, but he became a recurring antagonistic presence in the Thomas & Friends TV series
 In the book's  first illustration, a vicar and a man in a bow tie are seen looking at Duck. Brian Sibley suggests that these men are supposed to be the Rev. W. Awdry and C. Reginald Dalby.
 This is the first book to feature a diesel engine. The character was introduced at the suggestion of series editor Eric Marriott, who suggested that Awdry should introduce a diesel character to keep the series up-to-date. At the time, diesels were being increasingly used on British Railways, and would eventually come to supersede steam.
This is also the first book to include a real engine; City of Truro.
 The events of this book take place in 1957.

The Little Old Engine 
 Book no. 14
 Published July 1959
 Illustrated by John T. Kenney

 Stories
 Trucks!
 Home at Last
 Rock 'n' Roll
 Little Old Twins

This book continues the adventures of the Skarloey Railway. Skarloey returns from being repaired to discover that there are two new engines on the railway. Rusty is a diesel  engine who is friendly and helpful, but Duncan is a steam engine who is boisterous, stubborn, careless, and rude. Sir Handel is still his old self. A television crew comes to film a documentary on the railway, and Skarloey tells them about the Talyllyn Railway.

Notes
 This is the first appearance of Rusty and Duncan.
 First appearance of the Talyllyn Railway.
 The events of this book take place in 1958.

The Twin Engines 
 Book no. 15
 Published September 1960
 Illustrated by John T. Kenney

 Stories
 "Hullo Twins!"
 The Missing Coach
 Break Van
 The Deputation

The Fat Controller orders an engine from Scotland to help out with goods work, but is surprised when two engines arrive instead. To confuse matters further, the engines claim not to know their British Railways numbers, or which of them should have been sent. The engines are Donald and Douglas, and are twins. As whichever one of them is sent back will be scrapped, they are determined to stay. Despite some misadventures, the other engines convince the Fat Controller to keep both of them.

 Notes
 First appearances of Donald and Douglas, and only appearance of the Spiteful Brake Van.
 This book is the first to allude to the threat of scrapping faced by steam engines on British Railways.
 Gordon's Express is given a name in this book. It is called "the Wild Nor' Wester", an allusion to the fact that the Fat Controller's railway was properly known as the North Western Railway at this time. This was the first time that the name of the railway had been used in the books, and it reappears later in the form of the initials "NW" on the Spiteful Brake Van.
 'The Missing Coach' was originally intended to be an episode in Season 2 of Thomas & Friends but was cancelled halfway through production as Britt Allcroft believed the plot would be too difficult for young viewers to understand.
 The events of this book take place in 1959.

Branch Line Engines 
 Book no. 16
 Published November 1961
 Illustrated by John T. Kenney

 Stories
 Thomas Comes to Breakfast
 Daisy
 Bulls Eyes
 Percy's Predicament

Thomas has an accident by trashing the Stationmaster's breakfast and has to be sent to the Works. The Fat Controller orders a diesel railcar named Daisy to help out in his absence. Daisy is rather vain, neurotic, and convinced she knows it all, and decides that she is only going to do the work she wants. After a stern talking to and an accident by Percy, she is allowed to stay, with the encouragement of Toby. At the end of the book, Thomas comes back.

 Notes
 First appearance of Daisy, who is the first regular standard-gauge diesel character, and the first female 'engine' in the books (though she is more of a self-propelled coach).
 The events of this book must take place soon after those of The Twin Engines, as Donald and Douglas are seen with their old black paint in a cameo appearance (they decided to be repainted blue at the end of that book).
 Thomas' crash into the Stationmaster's house, which takes place in the first story of this book, was partially intended to enable a long-standing illustrators' error to be corrected. Thomas's footplate originally curved down at the front, meaning that his buffers were lower at the front than at the back. When Thomas returns from the Works, his footplate is straight, and this modification is retained from this book onwards.
 The top station on Thomas's branch line is shown in illustrations to be called Ffarquhar for the first time.
 The events of this book take place in 1960.

Gallant Old Engine 
 Book no. 17
 Published December 1962
 Illustrated by John T. Kenney

 Stories
 Special Funnel
 Steamroller
 Passengers and Polish
 Gallant Old Engine

After his accident with slate trucks, Peter Sam loses his old funnel and gets a new one to improve his steaming. Sir Handel has been given new wheels but soon gets into a fight with a rude steamroller named George. Duncan is jealous and feels overworked. Skarloey is shocked at Duncan's attitude, and tells the others about the time when Rheneas saved the railway, eventually changing Duncan's attitude. At the end of the book, Rheneas returns from his overhaul.

 Notes
 First appearance of George.
 Although this is the third book set on the Skarloey Railway, it is the first to include a story featuring Rheneas as the main character, who had been almost completely absent in the previous two volumes.
 This was the final volume to be illustrated by John T. Kenney, whose eyesight was beginning to fail around this time.
 There is a blue car (apparently a Wolseley 15/60 or 16/60) seen in one of the last illustrations of "Steam Roller" with a face. This was based upon John T. Kenney's own car, and its numberplate carries the letters "JTK" and "62", the year of the illustration, 1962.
 Two of the stories, Steamroller and Gallant Old Engine, are based on real incidents in earlier works, respectively Patrick Whitehouse's Narrow Gauge Album (1957) and L. T. C. Rolt's Railway Adventure (1952), occurring on the Cork and Muskerry Light Railway and Talyllyn Railway. Awdry received permission from the authors to use them.
 The events of this book take place in 1961. The past events of the story Gallant Old Engine took place in 1951.

Stepney the "Bluebell" Engine 
 Book no. 18
 Published November 1963
 Illustrated by Peter and Gunvor Edwards

 Stories
 Bluebells of England
 Stepney's Special
 Train Stops Play
 Bowled Out

Percy is sad to learn that steam engines on the Other Railway are being scrapped, and so he is glad when he hears that the Bluebell Railway has saved a number of them. Stepney, from the Bluebell Railway, comes to visit and soon makes friends with the engines, even teaching a boastful visiting diesel a lesson or two.

 Notes
 This is the first book to centre on a real engine, and was intended to promote the Bluebell Railway. Other Bluebell engines besides Stepney are referred to and appear in the pictures for "Stepney's Special". These included Bluebell, Primrose and Captain Baxter. "Adams" and "Cromford" were names applied by Awdry to the Bluebell Railway's Adams Radial Tank and North London Railway tank engine respectively.
 This book also features the first and only appearances of "The Diesel" and Caroline the car.
 The second illustration in the book depicts a group of Victorian locomotives being cut up for scrap. This was actually inspired by Peter Edwards' cover illustration for Graham Greene's 1936 novel A Gun for Sale, which featured a chase on a railway siding.
 Percy's claim that the controllers on British Railways are cruel and "don't like engines" is a reference to the 1955 Modernisation Plan, under which steam locomotives were to be replaced by diesel and electric traction. The Rev. W. Awdry notes in the foreword that Percy is mistaken, and that the controllers had been very helpful in preserving steam locomotives. Indeed, it is worth noting that several of the Bluebell Railway's engines had only been saved thanks to the intervention of such controllers.
 This was the first volume to be illustrated by Gunvor and Peter Edwards.
 The events of this book take place in 1962.

Mountain Engines 

 Book no. 19
 Published August 1964
 Illustrated by Gunvor and Peter Edwards

 Stories
 Mountain Engine
 Bad Look Out
 Danger Points
 "Devil's Back"

The Skarloey Railway engines meet Culdee, a strange-looking engine who climbs a mountain. He tells them all about his railway, and the tragic story of Godred, before returning home. At home, he meets the reckless Lord Harry, who causes trouble through his risk-taking. But when a climber runs into trouble, Lord Harry has an opportunity to redeem himself.

 Notes
 This is the only book to feature the Culdee Fell Railway (known within the stories as the Mountain Railway). Christopher Awdry has written that the reason there have been no new books set on the Mountain Railway is that the limited traffic and stringent safety precautions make it difficult to find suitable material for realistic stories set there.
 The Culdee Fell Railway is based on the Snowdon Mountain Railway, and like many of the Railway Series volumes, was written partly as a promotional device.
 See Culdee Fell Railway for details of the engines and rolling stock.
 The main events of this book take place in 1963. The past events of Mountain  Engine and Bad Look Out take place in 1900.

Very Old Engines 
 Book no. 20
 Published 16 April 1965
 Illustrated by Gunvor and Peter Edwards

 Stories
 Crosspatch
 Bucking Bronco
 Stick-in-the-Mud
 Duck and Dukes

It is 1965, and Skarloey and Rheneas are getting ready to celebrate their 100th birthday. Skarloey tells Nancy and other friends the story of his early life on the Skarloey Railway. The engines enjoy a wonderful centenary party.

 Notes
 This book was inspired by the 100th anniversary of the locomotives Talyllyn and Dolgoch, Skarloey and Rheneas' real life "twins". The first three stories are based on events from the early history of the Talyllyn Railway and one of the characters, Mr. Bobbie, is actually a real life engineer from the company that built the engines.
 This is the first, but not the last, book to be told mainly as a flashback. Skarloey narrates the stories Crosspatch and Bucking Bronco, while Rheneas narrates Stick-in-the-Mud.
 This book features a number of cameo appearances by Neil, an engine from the Sodor & Mainland Railway.
 "Duck and Dukes" would later be one of the main focal points in the 25th volume Duke The Lost Engine.
 The "Dukes" that Duck says "have all been scrapped" in real life refer to the Duke class of steam locomotives that were formerly used on the Great Western. The last one was scrapped in 1951.
 "Duck and Dukes" is the only story in this book whose title is not a former nickname for Skarloey.
 The present day events of this book take place in the first half of 1965. The past events of Crosspatch and Bucking Bronco take place in 1865, while the past events of Stick-in-the-Mud take place in 1867.

Main Line Engines 
 Book no. 21
 Published September 1966
 Illustrated by Gunvor and Peter Edwards

 Stories
 The Diseasel
 Buzz, Buzz
 Wrong Road
 Edward's Exploit

More adventures for the Main Line engines of the Fat Controller's Railway. Readers are introduced to Bill and Ben the tank engine twins, and a new diesel named BoCo arrives. Gordon and James both run into trouble, but Edward surprises everyone by getting a train home despite breaking down.

 Notes
 First appearances of Bill, Ben, and BoCo.
 Despite the book's title, much of the book actually takes place on Edward's branch line.
 The characters of Bill and Ben were inspired by Awdry's visit to Par, Cornwall, where he saw a pair of tank engines named Alfred and Judy. Although the driver of these engines was "a crusty old fellow who did not like parsons" (Rev. W. Awdry, quoted in The Thomas the Tank Engine Man), Awdry was able to impress him with his railway knowledge, and was even allowed to drive.
 The events of this book take place in the latter half of 1965.

Small Railway Engines 
 Book no. 22
 Published September 1967
 Illustrated by Gunvor and Peter Edwards

 Stories
 Ballast
 Tit-for-Tat
 Mike's Whistle
 Useful Railway

The Fat Controller has been using a special new kind of ballast, which Donald and Douglas say is brought by "verra wee engines". Duck is intrigued, and goes to see what the fuss is about. He discovers a miniature railway with three small engines named Mike, Bert and Rex. The focus then shifts to the small engines themselves, and some of the adventures they have.

 Notes
 The Arlesdale railway is based on the Ravenglass and Eskdale Railway. 
 The stories "Tit-for-Tat", "Mike's Whistle", and "Useful Railway" were adapted in the 20th season of Thomas & Friends, making all 3 stories the first Railway Series stories since "Mind that Bike" from Season 4 to be adapted into television. "Ballast" was not adapted, as the engines had already been introduced.
 The events of this book take place in the first half of 1967.

Enterprising Engines 
 Book no. 23
 Published 4 October 1968
 Illustrated by Gunvor and Peter Edwards

 Stories
 Tenders for Henry
 Super Rescue
 Escape
 Little Western

Gordon is saddened to learn that steam has ended on The Other Railway, and more so when he hears his siblings of the LNER Gresley Classes A1 and A3 have almost all been scrapped. To cheer him up, the Fat Controller brings his only surviving brother, the Flying Scotsman to Sodor. Henry is jealous because of Flying Scotsman's two tenders and is shown up by Duck, but comes to the rescue of two failed diesels despite failing himself. Meanwhile, Douglas saves a tank engine called Oliver and his rolling stock accomplices from scrap. The Fat Controller announces that Oliver can stay, along with the diesel engine D7101 (named Bear), and that he is reopening a branch line for Duck and Oliver. Furthermore, he announces that he will never, ever get rid of steam engines.

 Notes
 This marks the first appearance of Flying Scotsman, D7101 (Bear), Oliver, Toad and the Coaches: Isabel, Dulcie, Alice, and Mirabel. It marks the only appearance of Diesel 199 (Spamcan).
 "Super Rescue" is based on an event at London Waterloo station in April 1967, where a steam locomotive was used to rescue two diesel trains.
 The events of this book take place in the latter half of 1967.

Oliver the Western Engine 
 Book no. 24
 Published 15 November 1969
 Illustrated by Gunvor and Peter Edwards

 Stories
 Donald's Duck
 Resource and Sagacity
 Toad Stands By
 Bulgy

Life is exciting on the Little Western. Duck and Donald play practical jokes on each other. Oliver, attempting to look important, loses the respect of the trucks after an accident, but regains it with the help of Toad. Finally, a lying bus is put in his place after trying to steal the railway's passengers.

 Notes
 This book was originally to be called Little Western Engines, but the publishers wanted a book named after an engine. Awdry jokes in the foreword that if the attention goes to Oliver's head, he will set the publishers on to him.
 The Little Western is partly inspired by the Dart Valley Railway, according to the foreword.
 Only appearances of S. C. Ruffey, Bulgy, and Dilly the Duck.
 The foreword is actually written to the author's wife, Margaret Awdry. However, Margaret is referred to as M.
 The events of this book take place in 1968.

Duke the Lost Engine 
 Book no. 25
 Published 15 October 1970
 Illustrated by Gunvor and Peter Edwards

 Stories
 Granpuff
 Bulldog
 You Can't Win!
 Sleeping Beauty

Duke was a dignified but affectionate old engine who ran on the Mid Sodor Railway with Falcon and Stuart, who are better known nowadays as Sir Handel and Peter Sam. Despite his age, Duke was useful and well-loved by the people who visited his line but when the line closed, nobody wanted to buy him, and he was left behind in the engine shed whilst Falcon and Stuart were sold on. Over the following years, his shed was buried by a landslide and he was forgotten except by his old engine colleagues. The Fat Clergyman, the Thin Clergyman and the Small Controller led an expedition to find him, and eventually he is rescued and sent to live on the Skarloey Railway with his old friends.

 Notes
 First appearance of Duke and No. 2 (referred to as Stanley in off-hand material by Wilbert Awdry).
 Only appearance of the Mid Sodor Railway.
 Most of the book is told in flashback, and it fills in some history for the Arlesdale Railway and characters from the Skarloey Railway.
 Duke is based on the engine Prince from the Ffestiniog Railway. His abandonment and rediscovery is based on the story of Coronel Church, an engine from the Madeira-Mamoré Railroad in Brazil that was found preserved in the rainforest.
 The engine shed illustrated in the book is based on that at Snailbeach on the Snailbeach District Railways.
 The present day events of this book take place in 1969, where the Thin Clergyman (The Rev. W. Awdry), the Fat Clergyman (The Rev. "Teddy" Boston), the Small Controller (Fergus Duncan) and the Duke of Sodor (Sir Robert Norramby) found and met the engine Duke (named after His Grace: Sir John Arnold Norramby). The past events of Granpuff take place in 1928, 1947 and before 1951. And the end refers to 1965. The past events of Bulldog take place in 1904 (No. 2 incorrectly makes an illustration cameo, as his basis, the Baldwin Class 10-12-D was not introduced until WW1). The events of You Can't Win! take place in the late 1920s.
 You Can't Win! is the only story in this book whose title is not a former nickname for Duke.

Tramway Engines 
 Book no. 26
 Published 15 October 1972
 Illustrated by Gunvor and Peter Edwards

 Stories
 Ghost Train
 Woolly Bear
 Mavis
 Toby's Tightrope

This book focuses on Thomas's branch line. Percy plays a trick on Thomas, but later runs into trouble himself. Meanwhile, The Fat Controller has hired Mavis, a diesel engine working for the Ffarquhar Quarry Company, to help out while Thomas is absent, but Mavis is very headstrong and thinks Toby is an old fusspot. She pays no attention to his advice and causes a great deal of trouble, but eventually comes to Toby's rescue when his heavy load pushes him across a crumbling bridge.

 Notes
 First appearance of Mavis and the only appearance of Sam the Farmer.
 In "Woolly Bear", Thomas refers to Percy as "a green caterpillar with red stripes". This insult actually dates back to the book Percy the Small Engine. Awdry had long been unhappy with C. Reginald Dalby's depiction of Percy, describing it in exactly those terms.
 The last book in the series to be written by the Rev. W Awdry, and the last one until 1983.
 Tramway Engines had been a struggle for Awdry, and he was finding it harder and harder to come up with ideas. Although he considered a 27th book, he decided to retire. It would be more than a decade before there would be any new Railway Series books.
 The events of this book take place in the latter half of 1964.

The Christopher Awdry Era: 1983–2011 

Christopher Awdry, the Rev. W. Awdry's son, had some background in writing when he took over writing the Railway Series books, having written a number of articles for Steam Railway magazine. He was inspired to write some Railway Series stories by a visit to the Nene Valley Railway, with encouragement from his father. The publishers were eager for new books, as the television adaptation was in production at the time, and Christopher Awdry became the new Railway Series author.

All of his books were illustrated by Clive Spong, an illustrator who, it was felt, could combine technical accuracy with the appealing, colourful style exemplified by C. Reginald Dalby.

Christopher Awdry wrote his first book in 1983, and 13 further books followed between 1984 and 1996. No books were published between 1996 and 2007; book 40: New Little Engine, and the original books from The Railway Series went out-of-print. This was a source of friction between the Awdry family and the publishers. However, in February 2007, unofficial reports from the publishers, Egmont, suggested that there were plans to put the whole series back into print, in the original format, and that a new Christopher Awdry book (called Thomas and Victoria) was expected to be published later in 2007. This book, number 41 in the series, was published in September 2007, being the first Railway Series book to be published in 11 years. Number 42 in the series, called Thomas and his Friends, was published in June 2011.

In addition, the sixteen original Christopher Awdry books have been put together into a large, "bumper" edition, in a vein similar to the master collection of Wilbert Awdry's stories.

Really Useful Engines 
 Book no. 27
 Published 12 September 1983

 Stories
 Stop, Thief!
 Mind That Bike
 Fish
 Triple Header

This book unusually does not focus on any one area of the Fat Controller's Railway. Thomas helps arrest a car thief. Percy is able to help out a friend – by accident. Duck, acting as a helper for Henry, has an accident with the Flying Kipper due to a lamp falling off. Finally, all three tank engines get together to pull the Express when Gordon is ill.

 Notes
 Entirely by coincidence, the Rev. W. Awdry's planned 27th book was to be called Really Useful Engines.
 The story "Triple Header" was the first to be written, and was based upon an incident related to Christopher Awdry at the Nene Valley Railway. The real engine involved was a blue 0-6-0 tank engine called Thomas, which was named by Wilbert Awdry and is now permanently disguised as its Railway Series namesake.
 Thomas is seen with his front dip. At this time, he has a straight footplate. This was probably because of the illustrator not following directions.
 The events of this book take place in the late 1970s; 'Triple Header' takes place in 1979.

James and the Diesel Engines 
 Book no. 28
 Published 17 September 1984

 Stories
 Old Stuck-Up
 Crossed Lines
 Fire Engine
 Deep Freeze

James is one of the only engines who still does not trust diesels, which is not helped by the visit of a pompous diesel engine. He has a number of misadventures, but after a breakdown it is a diesel who helps him out, and he realises that diesel engines are not so bad after all.

 Notes
 This book marks the first appearance of the Works Diesel and the only appearance of 40125 aka Old Stuck-Up.
 The events of "Old Stuck-Up" took place in 1984. The actual 40125 was withdrawn from service in May 1981 and scrapped in December 1983.
 The events of "Old Stuck-Up" therefore would take place in the winter of 1983-84, while the remaining three stories take place in the first half of 1984.

Great Little Engines 
 Book no. 29
 Published 28 October 1985

 Stories
 Patience is a Virtue
 Peter Sam and the Prickly Problem
 Pop Special
 Sir Handel Comes Home

Duke has been mended and the Thin Controller sends Sir Handel to the Talyllyn Railway to help out while Talyllyn is being mended. While he is away, brambles and hot weather cause problems for the Skarloey Railway engines to solve. Sir Handel returns and tells them all about his adventures.

 Notes
 This book was inspired by the fact that the Talyllyn Railway had paid tribute to the Railway Series by repainting their engine No.3, Sir Haydn, to look like Sir Handel. Sir Handel's adventures on the Talyllyn are simply retellings of real events that took place involving that engine.
 The title alludes to "Great Little Trains", a promotional campaign for the narrow gauge railways of Wales. The Talyllyn Railway was part of this campaign.
 The events of "Patience is a Virtue" and "Peter Sam and the Prickly Problem" book take place in 1982, "Pop Special" takes place in 1983 and "Sir Handel Comes Home" takes place in 1984.

More About Thomas the Tank Engine 
 Book no. 30
 Published 22 September 1986

 Stories
 Thomas, Percy and the Coal
 The Runaway
 Better Late than Never
 Drip Tank

This is the 3rd book to be named after Thomas. Thomas and Percy have an argument and fallout. Both Bertie and Harold the Helicopter make appearances as Harold has to help Thomas from a runaway, and Thomas helps Bertie after he breaks down. Finally, Percy rescues Thomas after an accident along the branch line.

 Notes
 This book is unique in the series, in that it was written especially in order that Britt Allcroft could adapt it for the television show. The stories were therefore written specifically to include popular characters like Harold and Bertie. Despite this, the story 'Drip Tank' was never used in the TV show, and the feud in 'Thomas, Percy and the Coal' was therefore resolved in its adaptation.
 Thomas calls Percy a "drip" in the story 'Drip Tank', an insult meaning "pathetic" or "useless". Christopher Awdry has said that he regrets using this, as the insult had virtually fallen out of use by the time he wrote his book.
 He has also expressed dissatisfaction with the book in general, which he feels was unimaginative. He puts this down to the fact that it was put together in a hurry for the television company.
 The cattle truck that Percy is shunting in "Drip Tank" is marked with the initials "N.E.", an abbreviation used by the London & North Eastern Railway for its freight stock.
 The straight footplate Thomas has by now is back.
 The events of this book take place in 1985, which would therefore link Thomas's boasting in the first story back to recognising he had become a star on television, with the coincidental airing of the first season of Britt Allcroft's TV series.

Gordon the High Speed Engine 
 Book no. 31
 Published 7 September 1987

 Stories
 High-Speed Gordon
 Smokescreen
 Fire Escape
 Gordon Proves His Point

Gordon is jealous when Donald tells him about High Speed Trains on the Other Railway. He tries to copy them, but ends up slipping helplessly on the rails. He is then blamed for ruining wedding clothes with his smoke, and is well and truly in disgrace. But he manages to get the Express home after his firebars collapsed, and the Fat Controller forgives him. He also apologises – it transpires the spoiled wedding clothes weren't Gordon's fault. He is then allowed to take a special train to Carlisle and a High Speed Train named Pip & Emma arrives to assist while he is away. At last, Gordon is allowed to show how fast he is.

 Notes
 First appearance of Pip and Emma, who would later return as a Royal Train in Thomas and the Fat Controller's Engines and ultimately would be purchased by the Fat Controller.
 2 diesels, numbered 31120 and 10751, make appearances in the illustrations of this book.
 The events of this book take place in 1986.

Toby, Trucks and Trouble 
 Book no. 32
 Published 19 September 1988

 Stories
 Mavis and the Lorry
 Toby's Seaside Holiday 
 Bulstrode 
 Toby Takes the Road

The engines who work at Ffarquhar quarry have a number of adventures. Mavis has an accident, and so Toby and Percy have to help out more than usual. Toby remembers an event from the days before he came to the Fat Controller's Railway. The trucks manage to do a good turn when they accidentally put in his place a disagreeable barge named Bulstrode. Terence does the shunting for Percy and boasts about it, while adding that steam engines ploughed fields and ran on roads in the past. To add to that, on the day Mavis is due back from the Works, Toby has an accident at the crossing and briefly runs on the road like Trevor.

 Notes
 The only appearances of Bulstrode and 1020.
 'Toby's Seaside Holiday' is set in and around Great Yarmouth on the London & North Eastern Railway. As well as Toby himself, this story features an appearance by one of his brothers and two other engines from the old Great Eastern Railway.
 This book was the first in the series not to include the word "Engine" in the title. Christopher Awdry has observed that while it is in some ways a shame to break with tradition, it has opened up greater possibilities for future book titles.
 In 1990, Christopher Awdry wrote the annual story Hosepipes and Shunters to answer readers' questions on how Terence did the shunting for Percy and what was happening with Toby up at the quarry at the same time.
 This was the last Railway Series book to have a story televised until Series 20, where three stories from Small Railway Engines were adapted.
 8783 makes a cameo.
 The present-day events of this book take place in 1987.

Thomas and the Twins 
 Book no. 33
 Published 11 September 1989

 Stories
 Scrambled Eggs
 What a Picture!
 Trevor Helps Out
 Down the Drain

Repair work on Thomas's branch line means that he is sent to help on Edward's, which means he has to work with Bill and Ben at the china clay pits. Although the twins tease him at first, he soon earns their respect.

 Notes
 This book features the second appearance of Bill, Ben and Trevor.
 The events of the first three stories take place during 1988, while "Down the Drain" takes place in early 1989.

Jock the New Engine 
 Book no. 34
 Published 6 August 1990

 Stories
 We Need Another Engine
 Sticking Power
 Jock
 Teamwork

The Small Railway is short of power, and the Small Controller decides that what they need is another engine. The Railway's own workshops build a strong new engine called Jock, who at first thinks himself superior to the others. But the new engine eventually learns the value of teamwork, and all is forgiven.

 Notes
 First appearances of Jock and Frank.
 Frank has an accident when he crashes into the back of the shed. This was inspired by an incident on the Ravenglass and Eskdale Railway involving the diesel Perkins which took place soon after the book Small Railway Engines was published. People working on the railway joked that this accident was perhaps caused because Perkins was upset at not being included in the book.
 The character of Jock was not actually created for this book. In fact, he was first mentioned in the book The Island of Sodor: Its People, History and Railways – this was only the first book in which he put in an appearance.
 Jock is based on the R&E locomotive Northern Rock.
 The events of 'We Need Another Engine' take place in the latter half of 1967. The events of 'Sticking Power' take place in the latter half of 1975, and 'Jock' and 'Teamwork' take place in 1976.

Thomas and the Great Railway Show 
 Book no. 35
 Published 12 August 1991

 Stories
 Museum Piece
 Not the Ticket
 Trouble on the Line
 Thomas and the Railtour

Thomas is excited because the National Railway Museum at York have invited him to visit. He makes many new friends among the engines of the National Collection and has a few adventures along the way. He saves a train when he spots a landslide, and is made an honorary member of the National Collection.

 Notes
 This book was written at the request of the National Railway Museum.
 A reference to the television series is made in this volume.
 This book features appearances by real locomotives Stephenson's Rocket, Iron Duke, Mallard, Duchess of Hamilton and Green Arrow. Boxhill, another member of the collection, is mentioned but not seen.
 Clive Spong broke a major rule in this volume. All the engines at the National Railway Museum, except Rocket, are illustrated with faces. The Rev. W. Awdry had insisted that engines should not have faces, unless on Sodor.
 There are several references to guest characters from previous volumes. City of Truro and Flying Scotsman are both mentioned twice.
 In Gordon the High Speed Engine, Gordon mentions that he has a cousin who went at 126 miles per hour – a reference to Mallard.
 The reference to Flying Scotsman is particularly prescient – in 2004, Flying Scotsman was acquired by the National Railway Museum.
 'Trouble on the Line' was originally intended as a rail safety story, but Christopher Awdry was unhappy with the final result, as the publishers had "watered down" the original story. It is not known how the original story would have run, but Awdry tantalisingly notes in Sodor: Reading Between the Lines that it reflected badly on crowd control at the National Railway Museum.
 The Railway Series books are part of the National Railway Museum's library. So in a sense, Thomas really is part of the National Collection.
 The events of this book take place in 1990.

Thomas Comes Home 
 Book no. 36
 Published 15 June 1992

 Stories
 Snow Problem
 Washout!
 Toby's Megatrain
 Thomas Comes Home

While Thomas is away at the National Railway Museum, his branch is left in the care of Percy, Toby and Daisy. Daisy finds herself battling a snowstorm, Percy causes the bridge at Hackenbeck to collapse, and Toby takes more trucks than he can handle. On the day Thomas is due to come home, George leaves his cones at Dryaw Crossing, allowing one to stop Daisy. Everything is worked out when Thomas comes home.

 Notes
 This book marks the second and last appearance of George.
 Despite the book's title, Thomas only appears in the last illustration, and he does not speak.
 In Toby's Megatrain, Toby has two faces. It is unknown if this depiction is intentional or by mistake.
 The events of this book take place in 1991.

Henry and the Express 
 Book no. 37
 Published 8 April 1993

 Stories
 Out of Puff
 Overhaul
 Sliding Scales
 Henry Sees Red

Henry is due for an overhaul. Other engines help with his duties while he is away (for example, James hauls The Flying Kipper). But when there is no engine to take the Express, Henry is called back early and proves once again that he is a "Really Useful Engine".

 Notes
 This book features a brief appearance in one illustration of the Peel Godred Branch, the Island of Sodor's only electric railway. 
 The first illustration features a diesel talking to Gordon. According to Diana Awdry, Christopher Awdry's ex-wife, this is a return appearance of The "Works Diesel".
 This book features the first appearance of Oliver since Duke the Lost Engine, although he only makes cameo appearances.
 The events of this book take place in 1992.

Wilbert the Forest Engine 
 Book no. 38
 Published 8 August 1994

 Stories
 Percy's Porridge
 Cab Over Wheels
 Foaming at the Funnel
 Wired Up

Donald and Douglas are overworked. The Fat Controller arranges to borrow an engine called Wilbert from the Dean Forest Railway in Gloucestershire to help out. He tells Thomas and Toby the story of Sixteen, has his tank filled with milk rather than water and pulls a truck using wire.

 Notes
 Wilbert is a real engine. He is actually named after Rev. Wilbert Awdry, Christopher Awdry's father and the creator of the Railway Series. Wilbert Awdry was President of the Dean Forest Railway.
 This book also features the only appearance of Sixteen, a steelworks shunter.
 'Percy's Porridge' was written with the help of the children of Abingdon School as part of an exercise in creative writing, and the book is dedicated to them.
 The present day events of this book take place in 1993.

Thomas and the Fat Controller's Engines 
 Book no. 39
 Published 1 August 1995

 Stories
 Birdstrike
 Edward and the Cabbages
 Rabbits
 Golden Jubilee

It is 50 years since the first Railway Series books were published, and the Fat Controller plans to celebrate this occasion with a party. Unfortunately, things do not go entirely smoothly in the run-up to the celebration. Gordon has an accident with some birds, Edward loses a wheel, Thomas is derailed by some rabbits and a spider's web shorts out the electrics in the signalbox at Knapford Junction. But everything works out well in the end, and Pip and Emma bring a Royal Personage to enjoy the day with the Fat Controller's Engines.

 Notes
 This book was actually written to commemorate the very same anniversary the engines are celebrating in the stories.
 The book was originally to be titled The Fat Controller's Engines, but the publishers insisted on a Thomas link in the title.
 The events of this book take place in 1995.

New Little Engine 
 Book no. 40
 Published 8 August 1996

 Stories
 Speedkiller
 Sir Handel's Plan
 Dirty Water
 I Name This Engine...

The Skarloey Railway needs another engine. The Thin Controller announces that a new one will be built. In the meantime, Peter Sam is sent to visit the Talyllyn Railway. The engine is finally completed, and the railway's engineer, Mr Hugh, is to unveil the name. He is surprised to discover that the engine has been named Ivo Hugh – after himself!

 Notes
 First appearance of Ivo Hugh, Lizzie and Kathy. The railway's 2nd diesel engine, Fred, is mentioned but not seen.
 Peter Sam's visit commemorates the fact that the Talyllyn Railway again paid tribute to the Railway Series by repainting their engine, Edward Thomas, to look like Peter Sam.
 The name Ivo Hugh comes as a tribute to Tom Rolt, even to the number of letters in the names.
 During Speedkiller, Rheneas is drawn as an 0-4-2.
 Throughout the story "I Name This Engine...", Duke is missing his tender.
 Throughout the whole book, Peter Sam is missing half of his running gear.
 The events of this book take place in 1996.

Thomas and Victoria 
 Book no. 41
 Published 3 September 2007

 Stories
 Overloaded
 Avalanche
 Eels on Wheels
 Toby's Vintage Train

Toby and Henrietta are overcrowded carrying the workmen from the Quarry and a close call at a level crossing shows how desperate the situation is – an extra carriage is needed urgently. Thomas finds the perfect solution when he meets Victoria – an old carriage. While Victoria is being renovated, she tells Edward a tale from the old days on the Furness Railway. Meanwhile, Daisy discovers that she doesn't like eels very much when a whole boxful of eels escape on to the platform! Once finished, Victoria is taken over to Knapford Junction and joins Toby and Henrietta as Sodor's Vintage Train.

 Notes
 First Railway Series book published in over 11 years.
 First appearance of Victoria, a blue Furness Railway 4-wheeled coach; Helena, another coach and Albert, a Furness Railway locomotive.
 Henrietta is seen in this book with a small rectangular face on her door. This is the first instance in the books where Henrietta is seen with a face.
 Despite the title, Thomas only speaks once in the book.
 This book is dedicated to the Reverend W. Awdry.
 During this book, it is revealed that Edward comes from the Furness Railway.
 The present-day events of this book take place in the first half of 2007.

Thomas and his Friends 
 Book no. 42
 Published 6 July 2011

 Stories
 Thomas and the Swan
 Buffer Bashing
 Gordon's Fire Service
 Centenary

The Fat Controller welcomes back Pip and Emma to help on his Railway. Thomas is delighted; Gordon is worried that his time as the Express is over. But every engine has its day! Thomas makes an important rescue, Gordon proves himself a hero, and all the engines celebrate a Very Important Event.

 Notes
Final book in the Railway Series.
The final lines of the book come from The Prince and are spoken as he exits Annie and Clarabel. Said lines were “my parents read stories about your railway to me as a child. There will never be anything like it anywhere.”
 This book was written to mark the centenary of the birth of the Reverend W. Awdry.
 For the first time ever in the series, the electric engines that work the Peel Godred branch are mentioned in the text.
 This book is dedicated to the Reverend W. Awdry.
  The events of this book took place in the first half of 2011.
 This book marks the only time in the series' history that "The End" was used at the end of a book, as this is the final book in the Railway Series.

Railway Series-related books 
There have been several Railway Series-related books published which were written by the Awdrys, but which are not actually part of the Railway Series proper. Nonetheless, they complement the original books and are considered canon.

The Annuals 

From 1979 to 1980 the Thomas the Tank Engine and Friends annuals were written by Rev. W. Awdry, and from 1985 to 1996 by Christopher Awdry. They included several stories and articles about the characters. In some cases, these stories expanded upon earlier Railway Series books and in others they were entirely new. One, 'The Strawberry Special' in the 1985 Annual, was later rewritten and used in Thomas Comes Home as 'Toby's Megatrain'.

A number of new characters were introduced in the annuals. Perhaps the most notable was Algy the Bus, a friend of Bertie's. Also, Henry's Driver's name is revealed to be Ted in one of the later annuals.

Thomas's Christmas Party 

 Published 29 October 1984
 Written by Rev. W. Awdry
 Illustrated by Clive Spong

A one-off story written especially for the television series – the only Rev. W. Awdry-authored story to be so written. The engines hold a special Christmas celebration for Mrs Kyndley.

Thomas Comes to Breakfast 

 Published 2 September 1985
 Written by Rev. W. Awdry
 Illustrated by Clive Spong

An expanded version of the first story from Branch Line Engines, which also summarises the remainder of that book.

Thomas and the Missing Christmas Tree 

 Published 20 October 1986
 Written by Christopher Awdry
 Illustrated by Clive Spong

This story was also written for the television series and was used in the 2nd series. Thomas the Tank Engine is sent to fetch a Christmas tree, but runs into a snowdrift. It is up to Donald and Douglas to save the day for him.

Thomas and the Evil Diesel 

 Published 5 October 1987
 Written by Christopher Awdry
 Illustrated by Clive Spong

When Percy has to go to the Works for repairs, Diesel returns to Sodor and, as expected, causes trouble for the engines by destroying the oldest truck in Ffarqhuar Yards, but two days later, Thomas has an accident when Daisy drips her oil on the track and Clarabel's back wheels come off the tracks at the special points at Dryaw, so Diesel comes to the rescue. It seems that even Diesel has some good in him somewhere.

 Notes
 In the United States, this book was published with the title Thomas and the Naughty Diesel. A later version with illustrations similar to the My-First models was released under the title Thomas and Diesel.
 This book marks Diesel's second visit to Sodor.
 Diesel was the only engine available to come to Sodor in this book, a device that Britt Allcroft would use in the TV series (this book was also written at her request, despite not being adapted).
 This is Clarabel's first accident.
 Three of Clive Spong's illustrations from this book would be modified for the Railway Series books Thomas And The Great Railway Show, Thomas Comes Home, and Thomas And The Fat Controller's Engines.
 The special points scenario of the book would inspire Christopher Awdry to write the 1991 Annual story Near Miss, which would explain to readers why special points are important to the railway.

Thomas and Gordon Off The Rails 

 Published 3 September 1990
 Written by Christopher Awdry
 Illustrated by Stephen Lings

Gordon falls into a ditch and after teasing him about it, Thomas falls down a mine.

Thomas and the Hurricane 

 Published 16 March 1992
 Written by Christopher Awdry
 Illustrated by Stephen Lings

A hurricane hits Sodor, causing chaos for the engines.

Bad Days for Thomas and His Friends / More Bad Days for Thomas and His Friends 

 Published 2001
 Written by Christopher Awdry
 Illustrated by David Anderson

A pair of books written to highlight rail safety using characters from the Railway Series. They were written partially due to Christopher Awdry's frustration at not being able to include a proper rail safety story in his 1991 Railway Series book Thomas and the Great Railway Show ("published 10 years before").

Bad Days for Thomas and His Friends stories
 New Paint for Annie and Clarabel – Some boys are caught spraying graffiti around the station and on the 2 coaches.
 A Near Miss for Daisy – Some children on Thomas's branch line have been causing trouble throwing rocks at the trains and placing objects on the rails, one of which Daisy almost has a run-in with.
 Lucy to the Rescue – A boy named Andrew is riding his bike along the railway when one of his tires gets stuck between 2 rail joints. His dog Lucy runs ahead and warns Thomas, who was approaching with a train.

More Bad Days for Thomas and His Friends stories
 Toby and the Skateboarders – A boy has a near miss when he falls off the station platform while skateboarding near Toby.
 Nearly an Unhappy Christmas – A girl named Alysha's new hat blows off and is stuck between some electric railway wires. An engine and his driver stop her just before she reaches out to get it.
 Trouble on the Train – Two naughty girls push a girl named Gemma out of Annie and run off just before the train was due to leave. Thomas, Annie and Clarabel think Gemma should report the names of the other girls.

 Notes
 Policeman Len appears in every story, disciplining or helping the children as needed.
 The Peel Godred branch appears in the story Nearly an Unhappy Christmas, as well as one of its engines, who has yet to be named.
 Colouring book versions of the two books were produced by Virgin Trains for children to colour in during their train journeys.

Companion volumes

The Island of Sodor: Its People, History and Railways 

 Published 1987
 Written by Rev. W. Awdry and George Awdry
 Illustrated by Clive Spong

This is a book about the Island of Sodor, dealing with its history, geography and industry in far greater depth than could ever be discussed in the Railway Series stories themselves. Most of the background information on the places, people, railways and engines in the Railway Series comes from this book.

The book came about as a result of Rev. W. Awdry's desire to create a credible and consistent world for his stories. This began with maps of Sodor, and was then expanded upon. Rev. W. Awdry and his brother George (who was the librarian of the National Liberal Club) worked out details of Sodor, producing between them a comprehensive set of notes. These notes were compiled and published in this book.

The Thomas the Tank Engine Man 

 Published 1995
 Written by Brian Sibley

A biography of Rev. W. Awdry and companion to the series. Although it is not officially a Railway Series publication, it includes a great deal of background information on the series from the Awdrys that is not available elsewhere. Although it is not canon as such, therefore, it contains a lot of information that is.

Sodor: Reading Between the Lines 

 Published 2005
 Written by Christopher Awdry

This book is a companion volume to the Railway Series, providing comprehensive biographies of the characters within the books and exploring the origins of the stories. Like The Island of Sodor: Its People, History and Railways, it included aspects of the fictional universe that were never featured in the Railway Series stories. It described the fictional developments on the railway since 1996.

References

External links 
 The Real Stories Database (archived) gives real life parallels to many of these stories

 Books
The Railway Series, books in